Speed is an unincorporated community in Roane County, West Virginia, United States. Speed is located on U.S. Route 119, south of Spencer.

References

Unincorporated communities in Roane County, West Virginia
Unincorporated communities in West Virginia